Micah Brooks (May 14, 1775July 7, 1857) was a U.S. Representative from New York.

Life
Brooks received his early education from his father. He was a pioneer and one of the earliest surveyors of western New York.

He was appointed a Justice of the Peace in 1806. He was a member from Ontario County of the New York State Assembly in 1808-09. He served as colonel on the frontier and at Fort Erie during the War of 1812. He was a major general of the New York State Infantry from 1828 to 1830.

Brooks was elected as a Democratic-Republican to the 14th United States Congress, holding office from March 4, 1815, to March 3, 1817. Afterwards he engaged in agricultural pursuits.

He was a delegate to the New York State Constitutional Convention of 1821. He was elected a presidential elector in 1824 and cast his vote for John Quincy Adams.

He was buried at the Nunda Cemetery in Nunda, New York.

References

The New York Civil List compiled by Franklin Benjamin Hough (pages 57, 70, 261 and 326; Weed, Parsons and Co., 1858)

1775 births
1857 deaths
1824 United States presidential electors
People from Cheshire, Connecticut
People from Ontario County, New York
Members of the New York State Assembly
United States Army generals
Democratic-Republican Party members of the United States House of Representatives from New York (state)
People from Nunda, New York